Palunku is a 2006 Malayalam-language drama film written and directed by Blessy. It stars Mammootty in the lead role with  Nazriya Nazim making her on-screen debut through this film- along with Lakshmi Sharma, Baby Nivedita, Kottayam Santha and Jagathy Sreekumar playing other pivotal roles. Lakshmi Sharma made her debut as an actress with this film. The film exposes the trappings of consumerism and how city life changes the perspective and priorities of an ordinary farmer,   Monichan (Mammootty).

The film was mainly shot at various locations in Muvattupuzha and Thodupuzha. It released on 22 December 2006. Mammootty won the Best Actor award at the Kerala Film Critics Awards and national award nomination.

Plot
Palunku tells the story of an industrious farmer Monichan and his family, which consists of his wife Susamma, and his daughters Geethu and Neethu, whom he lovingly calls 'Ponnu' and 'Kilunthu'. Monichan is happy with his life as a farmer and loves his family, his profession, nature and the people around him.

At a juncture in his life, he is forced to take his daughters to a school in the town, simply because the school in his village cannot accommodate his elder daughter, who is in fifth standard, as there are not enough students to run classes. Thus Geethu and Neethu join an English medium school. Monichan brings the children to school every morning and hangs around in town till evening to take them back.

In the course of this routine, Monichan gets close to Soman Pillai, a shrewd lottery agent, who knows all kinds of short-cuts to earn money. Soman Pillai becomes Monichan's advisor. Monichan buys a bicycle and the father and the daughters now travel to town and back on the bicycle. In the meantime Monichan joins a class conducted for elders and starts learning to read and write Malayalam as well as English. A minor accident makes Monichan shift over to the town along with his family.

Once in town, Monichan finds himself entrapped in a vicious circle. He, with the help of Soman Pillai, begins to tread down the wrong path - lending out money, and doing things not entirely above board. His life changes slowly. He is no longer the naive farmer he used to be. Even his wife has changed, spending her time watching soap operas on TV and dreaming about modern household amenities. But fate has something else in store for them. They lose their elder daughter Geethu because she was raped and killed by a seventeen-year-old boy. The courts punishes the boy by sending him to the juvenile jail. However Monichan is not satisfied. In the end, he realizes his mistakes and is shown to go back his ways as a farmer.

Cast
Mammooty  as Monichan
Lakshmi Sharma  as Susamma
Nazriya Nazim  as Geethu
Baby Nivedita  as Neethu
Jagathy Sreekumar  as Soman Pillai
Nedumudi Venu  as Teacher
Thampi Antony as Prof. Sukumaran Nair
 Santhakumari as Lalitha
Tony Sigimon  as Alexander
Kottayam Santha  as Ammayi
Subair  as Police Officer
 Mahima
Vishnu Unnikrishnan as Asalappan.

Critical reception

A review by The Hindu said, "Palunku is a commendable attempt at portraying the changing attitude of the modern Malayali through the story of a small family of a husband, wife and two children. The family succumbs to the temptations of a modern lifestyle and gets down to making money. The movie realistically depicts how the craze for modernity and consumerist culture affects family values".

Soundtrack
The soundtrack to the film was composed by Mohan Sithara with lyrics penned by Kaithapram.

"Maanathe Velli" - Dr. K. J. Yesudas
"Pottu Thotta" - P. Jayachandran, Jassie Gift, Sheela Mani
"Ettuvatta Kettum" - G. Venugopal, Anwar Sadath
"Neruparayanam" - Madhu Balakrishnan, Anu

References

External links

2000s Malayalam-language films
2006 drama films
2006 films
Films directed by Blessy
Films scored by Mohan Sithara